Baeocystin is a zwitterionic alkaloid and analog of psilocybin. It is found as a minor compound in most psilocybin mushrooms together with psilocybin, norbaeocystin, aeruginascin, and psilocin.  Baeocystin is an N-demethylated derivative of psilocybin, and a phosphorylated derivative of 4-HO-NMT (4-hydroxy-N-methyltryptamine).  The structures at right illustrate baeocystin in its zwitterionic form.

Baeocystin was first isolated from the mushroom Psilocybe baeocystis, and later from P. semilanceata, Panaeolus renenosus, Panaeolus subbalteatus, and Copelandia chlorocystis. It was first synthesized by Troxler et al. in 1959.

Little information exists with regard to human pharmacology, but in the book Magic Mushrooms Around the World, author Jochen Gartz reports being aware of a study in which "10 mg of baeocystin were found to be about as psychoactive as a similar amount of psilocybin." Gartz also reported in a research paper that a self-administered assay of 4 mg of baeocystin caused "a gentle hallucinogenic experience".

While Gartz describes experiencing a "gentle hallucinogenic experience" from baeocystin, this could not be replicated in a mouse model in a 2019 study which found no evidence that baeocystin produces any hallucinogenic effects. Researchers compared psilocybin which is a known hallucinogen to baeocystin by using the mouse head-twitch response. Upon comparison, baeocystin was indistinguishable from saline solution, indicating "...baeocystin alone would likely not induce hallucinogenic effects in vivo". This does contrast however with the human experiences mentioned above, although high quality data is scarce.

See also 
 Norbaeocystin
 Psilocin
 Psilocybin

References

Tryptamine alkaloids
Organophosphates
Psychedelic tryptamines